Emre Aracı (born 22 December 1968) is a Turkish music historian, conductor, and composer.

Life 
Aracı is a Turkish music historian, composer and conductor who has been living in the United Kingdom since 1987.  He has made original contributions to the scholarship of Turkish music through his pioneering research focusing primarily on the European musical practice in the Ottoman court.

Aracı studied music at the University of Edinburgh, graduating in 1994 with a BMus (Hons.) degree which was followed by a PhD in 1999. Supported by Lady Lucinda Mackay and the Inchcape Foundation, the subject of his thesis was the life and works of Turkey's eminent 20th-century composer Ahmed Adnan Saygun (1907–1991).

During his years at Edinburgh, Aracı played an active role in the musical life of the university and founded the Edinburgh University String Orchestra, which still continues to give regular concerts and is run by student volunteers.  In 2000 the orchestra established the Emre Aracı Composition Prize which has since been annually awarded to young aspiring student composers.

Thanks to a funding by the Turkish Economy Bank (TEB), between 1999-2002 Aracı was Research Associate at the Skilliter Centre for Ottoman Studies, University of Cambridge, where his interest in the European music of the Ottoman Empire grew. In 1999 he also founded a string orchestra called The London Academy of Ottoman Court Music who performed his own orchestrations of compositions by Italian musicians resident at the Turkish court in the 19th century, as well as original works by Ottoman sultans in the popular dance forms of the period, such as waltzes, polkas and mazurkas. The ensemble which was in existence between 1999 and 2003 performed in London at venues including St James's Piccadilly and St John's Smith Square. At Cambridge they gave an historic concert in the Chapel of Trinity College in 2000. Warner Classics released an album featuring a selection of these imperial compositions recorded by the ensemble in 2002, under the title of Invitation to the Seraglio. In Turkey the same material was pre-released by Kalan Records on two CDs; European Music at the Ottoman Court and War and Peace: Crimea 1853-56.

Research interests, concerts, and recordings 
After 2002 Aracı mainly turned to international orchestras for recordings and concerts. Bosphorus by Moonlight which features his violin concerto bearing the same title was recorded in the Rudolfinum by the Prague Symphony Orchestra with the Turkish violinist Cihat Aşkın. The same album also includes miniature musical portrait pieces of the Ottoman Imperial family by Callisto Guatelli Pasha, an Italian who served the sultans as the director of the palace orchestra in Istanbul. Guatelli succeeded Giuseppe Donizetti Pasha in the same post; the eldest brother of Gaetano Donizetti, Giuseppe settled in Turkey in 1828 and remained there for the rest of his life until his death in 1856. Aracı wrote the first comprehensive biography of Donizetti Pasha which was published in Turkish in 2006. He also conducted a commemorative concert in Bergamo at the Teatro Donizetti on 4 December 2007 on the same stage where the Italian bandmaster once appeared in a production.

Istanbul to London Aracı's fourth album released by Kalan Records in Turkey was also recorded in the Rudolfinum with the Prague Symphony Orchestra and Philharmonic Choir and features two choral hymns, one by Angelo Mariani and the other by Luigi Arditi. Both musicians performed before Sultan Abdülmecid I and composed Imperial Anthems in the Ottoman language which were sung by Italians phonetically. The latter's Inno Turco was sung by a British choir of 1600 when Sultan Abdülaziz visited London in 1867 in his presence at Crystal Palace. Aracı's historic reconstructions of these works, although with much limited forces, and recorded by Ates Orga like the rest of his world premiere albums, are significant contributions towards resurrecting the Euro-Ottoman repertoire, hitherto unknown among musicologists. Euro-Ottomania in fact became the title of Brilliant Classic's global release; including the choral numbers as well as August Ritter von Adelburg's Symphonie-Fantasie, Aux Bords du Bosphore, which The Gramophone (April 2008) described as "an unexpectedly attractive collection, and the musical presentation is expert, idiomatic and alive".

Emre Aracı is also active as a public speaker on topics relating to Turkish-European musical exchange, having lectured at venues ranging from New York University and the British Museum to the Royal Academy of Arts in London and the Universities of Cambridge, Oxford, Sarajevo and Vienna. As cultural ambassador, his lecture tours organised by the Turkish Foreign Ministry and hosted by various Turkish Embassies, have taken him to many parts of the world, from Ottawa to Islamabad. He contributes to Turkish and English journals including Andante, The Court Historian, International Piano, The Musical Times and "Cornucopia", a magazine about Turkish art and culture. As well as taking part in the Izmir and Istanbul International Festivals, Dr Aracı has also worked with various Turkish orchestras including the Presidential Symphony Orchestra, Istanbul State Symphony Orchestra, Antalya Opera and the Borusan and Istanbul Chamber Orchestras. He gave a performance with the Amsterdam Sinfonietta in the Netherlands in the presence of HM Queen Beatrix of the Netherlands in December 2006 and in May 2008 with Alexander Rudin's orchestra, Musica Viva, in Moscow. Recent performances took place in Latvia and Estonia, including Tartu and Tallinn, the latter being in the historic Kadriorg Palace, as well as a concert in Aya Irini in Istanbul with the Naval Forces Band and the Istanbul State Symphony Orchestra on 20 October 2008.

Based in the United Kingdom, he continues his Turco-European historical music research under the patronage of the Çarmıklı family / Nurol Holding Inc.

Works 
Voice and Orchestra
Farewell to Halûk [A setting of the Turkish poet Tevfik Fikret's poem Halûk'un Vedaı], (baritone and orchestra), 1994

Orchestra
Elegy for Erkel [for Osman Erkel], (strings and timpani), 1993
Marche Funèbre et Triomphale, (strings and percussion), 1995
Turkish Ambassador's Grand March, (Dedicated to Ambassador and Mrs Özdem Sanberk) (strings), 1998
In Search of Lost Time, for the Golden Jubilee of HM Queen Elizabeth II (large orchestra), 2002

Solo Instrument and Orchestra
Bosphorus by Moonlight [Inspired by Abdülhak Şinasi Hisar’s novel bearing the same title], Violin Concerto (strings), 1997

Voice and Piano
In Memoriam Lord Leighton (soprano), 2002
Idyllic Prague [Inspired by Siegfried Sassoon’s poem Idyll], (baritone), 2003

Solo Piano
Prelude alla Turca, 2004

Books and CDs 
European Music at the Ottoman Court (Kalan, CD 177)
War and Peace: Crimea 1853-56 (Kalan, CD 257)
Bosphorus by Moonlight (Kalan, CD 303)
Istanbul to London (Kalan, CD 349)
Invitation to the Seraglio (Warner Classics, 2564-61472-2)
Euro-Ottomania (Brilliant Classics, 93613)
Adnan Saygun – Doğu Batı Arası Müzik Köprüsü (YKY, 2001) [In Turkish]
Donizetti Paşa – Osmanlı Sarayının İtalyan Maestrosu (YKY, 2006) [In Turkish]
Naum Tiyatrosu – 19. Yüzyıl İstanbulu'nun İtalyan Operası (YKY, 2010) [In Turkish]
Kayıp Seslerin İzinde (YKY, 2011) [In Turkish]

Articles (in Turkish and English) 
‘Saygun ve Tippett’, Orkestra, September 1996, 15-20
‘İngiltere Kraliçesi II. Elizabeth’in Sultan III. Mehmed’e hediyesi’, Orkestra, November 1996, 7-11
‘Adnan Saygun’u hatırlarken’, Orkestra, January 1997, 12-17
‘Londra’da bir kitapçının tezgahındaki Türk marşı notası’, Orkestra, February 1997, 18-22
‘Sir Michael Tippett’, Orkestra, April 1997, 20-26
‘Franz Liszt’in İstanbul macerası’, Toplumsal Tarih, June 1997, 33-35
‘Reforming Zeal’, The Musical Times, September 1997, 12-15
‘Tchaikovsky: Tolstoy ile başlayan dostluk ve İstanbul’dan geçen yolculuk’, Orkestra, November 1997, 17-21
'George Malcolm vefat etti', Orkestra, November 1997, 38-39
‘Londra Crystal Palace’ta Abdülaziz şerefine verilen konser’, Toplumsal Tarih, January 1998, 29-33
‘Ekselansın besteci eşi’, Cumhuriyet Dergi, 8 March 1998, 4-5
‘İngiliz müziğinin vicdani retçisi’, Cumhuriyet Dergi, 15 March 1998, 4-5
‘Michael Tippett’ten Adnan Saygun’a mektuplar’, Toplumsal Tarih, May 1998, 47-50
‘Luigi Arditi ve Türk Kasidesi’nin çözülen esrarı’, Toplumsal Tarih, September 1998, 23-27
‘Ekselansları Ömer Paşa’nın eşi ya da Macar asıllı Ida Hanım’, Cumhuriyet Dergi, 6 September 1998, 2-3
‘Bir festival şehri’, Cumhuriyet Dergi, 18 October 1998, 18-19
‘Londra’da bir Türk kasidesi’, Cumhuriyet Dergi, 31 January 1999, 6-7
‘Barbaros’un İskoçya’daki kılıcı’, Cumhuriyet Dergi, 8 August 1999, 2-4
‘Rossini’nin Abdülmecid Marşı’, Milliyet Sanat, December 1999, s. 68
‘Ode to a Sultan’, Cornucopia, no. 20, vol. 4, 2000, 88-93
‘Music to a Sultan’s ear’, Cornucopia, no. 22, vol. 4, 2000, 26
‘Ekselansları Ömer Paşa’nın besteci karısı’, Toplumsal Tarih, February 2000, 13-16
‘Ekselansları Ömer Paşa’nın Zevcesi’, Skylife, February 2000, 87-94
‘Orgun sultana yolculuğu’, Cumhuriyet Dergi, 6 February 2000, 12-14
‘Mozart Türkiye’de’, Toplumsal Tarih, May 2000, 58-60
‘Franz Liszt İstanbul’da’, Cumhuriyet Dergi, 14 May 2000, 12-13
‘Savaş bitti şimdi dobro dosli’, Cumhuriyet Dergi, 11 June 2000, 10-12
‘Orgalar: Parçalanmış bir aile’, Cumhuriyet Dergi, 29 October 2000, 2-3
‘Batı’da Mehter Modası’, Cumhuriyet Dergi, 1 July 2001; ['Avrupa'nın mehterleri' adı altında Andante'''de de yayımlanmıştır, bkz: Mozart özel sayısı, 20–31 March 2004]
‘Franz Liszt at the Ottoman court’, International Piano Quarterly, Winter 2001, 14-19
‘Giuseppe Donizetti Pasha and the family archive in Istanbul’, Newsletter of the Donizetti Society, No: 83, June 2001
'Lord Byron'un evinde', Cumhuriyet Dergi, 15 September 2002, 10
The Levantine Donizetti, The Musical Times, Autumn 2002, 49-56
‘Viktorya dönemi popüler müzik kültüründe Osmanlı temaları’, Andante, October–November 2002, issue: 1, 44-46
‘Giuseppe Donizetti Pasha and the Polyphonic Court Music of the Ottoman Empire, The Court Historian, vol: 7, Aralık 2002, 135-143
‘Adnan Saygun ve Yunus Emre’, Andante, April–May 2003, issue: 4, 23-25
‘Levanten bir hayat Giuseppe Donizetti Osmanlı Sarayı’nda I’, Andante, April–May 2003, issue: 4, 61-63 [The Musical Times dergisinin sonbahar 2002 sayısında yayımlanan makalenin Türkçe tercümesidir]
‘Levanten bir hayat Giuseppe Donizetti Osmanlı Sarayı’nda II’, Andante, June–July 2003, issue: 5, 47-49
‘Dolmabahçe’den Bayreuth’a uzanan yardım eli’, Andante, December 2003-January 2004, issue: 8, 29-31
‘Boğaziçi mehtaplarında opera tadı’, Andante, August–September 2003, sayı: 6, 32-35 (Emre Aracı, Selim İleri ve Serhan Bali sohbeti)
‘Boğaziçi mehtaplarında sultanlarla vals’, Andante, August–September 2003, sayı: 6, 83-84
‘Dolmabahçe’den Oxford ve Eton’a’, Andante, November–December 2004, sayı: 13, 38-40
‘Gian Carlo Menotti: İskoçya’nın ilk ve son İtalyan grand maestrosu’, Andante, February–March 2004, sayı: 9, 20-24
‘Beethoven tutkunu bir halife’, Hanedandan bir ressam Abdülmecid Efendi, YKY 2004, 113-122
‘Bartók, d’Indy ve Schola Cantorum: Adnan Saygun’un etkisinde kaldığı müzik adamları ve akımları’, Biyografya, issue: 5, 2004
‘Emre Aracı, 21. yüzyılda yalnız bir neo-romantik’, Andante, June–July–August 2004, issue: 11, 16-23 (Serhan Bali’nin Emre Aracı ile röportajı)
'Vedat Kosal'ın anısına', Andante, July–September 2005, issue: 17 (Ek), 6-7
‘İstanbul’dan Londra’ya’, Andante, September–November 2005, issue: 18, 24-25
‘Istanbul to London: 19th century Ottoman choral and symphonic music’, Kadir Has University “Culture and Arts” Lecture Series, selected talks 2003-2005, 125-133
‘Food, music, Rossini and the Sultan’, Turkish Cookery, Saqi Books, 2006
‘İsmail Paşa, Verdi ve Saint-Saëns: Kahire’de kayıp bir müzik geçmişini arayış…’, Andante, November–December 2006, issue: 25, 20-22
‘In search of ruined castles and rainy skies, rolling hills and Highland mist’, Gusto Turkey, December 2006-January 2007, issue: 2, 66
‘Emre Aracı ile Donizetti Paşa üzerine’, Andante, January–February 2007, issue: 26, 30-31
‘İskoçya’nın son grand maestrosu yaşama veda etti’, Andante, March–April 2007, issue: 27, 14-15
‘Liszt’in öğrencisinin öğrencisiyle bir öğleden sonra’, Andante, March–April 2007, issue: 27, 44-46
‘Guatelli Paşa: Osmanlı sarayının ikinci İtalyan maestrosu’, Metin And’a Armağan Kitabı, 2007, 285-297
‘Théâtre Impérial de Dolma-Baktché / Boğaz Kıyısındaki Versailles Operası’, Sanat Dünyamız, Spring 2007, issue: 102, 74-83
‘A. Adnan Saygun: Evrensellik yolunda filozof bir besteci’, 21. Uluslararası İzmir Festivali Kitabı, 2007, 31
'Da Donizetti a Guatelli: Musicisti italiani alla corte ottomana', Gli Italiani di Istanbul, (Istituto Italiano di Cultura di Istanbul), Torino 2007, 273-280
'İstanbul saray müziğinde İtalyan ayak izleri / Influenze Italiane nella musica di corte del palazzo imperiale di Istanbul', İstanbul'daki İtalyan İzi / Presenze Italiane a Istanbul, Ferroli 2008, 180-193
'Sanatın müzikle buluştuğu Prag operaları', Antik Dekor, February–March 2008, issue: 105, 132-137
‘Donizetti Paşa'yı Donizetti Tiyatrosu'nda anmak ve anlatmak’, Andante, February–March 2008, issue: 32, 78-80
‘İngiltere sarayına sunulan itimatnameler’, Antik Dekor, April–May 2008, issue: 106, 96-100
‘Ainola'da Sibelius'un ruhuna ulaşmak’, Andante, August–September 2008, issue: 35, 47-49
‘Geoffrey Lewis'in ardından’, Kitap-lık, September 2008, issue: 119, 5-6
‘Wagner, Ludwig, Lohengrin ve Tristan’, Andante, October–November 2008, issue: 36, 66-70
‘Metin And - Gönlü Yüce Türk’, Andante, October–November 2008, issue: 36, 82-83
‘Reminiscences of a concert at Bellapais’, Cyprus Times, 11 November 2008, issue: 1300, 4
‘Bartók'un oğluyla bir saat’, Andante, December 2008-January 2009, issue: 37, 50-53
‘Giray ve Ross'un yeni Saygun keman konçertosu edisyonu’, Andante, December 2008-January 2009, issue: 37, 96-97
'Bavyera kralı II. Ludwig'in Alpler'in eteğindeki beyaz şatosu', Antik Dekor, February–March 2009, issue: 111, 80-89
'Haydn, Don Juan ve Greillenstein', Andante, June–July 2009, issue: 40, 76-79
'Handel'in Londra'daki evi', Andante, June–July 2009, issue: 40, 98-100
'Tosti, Caruso, Delius and The Grand', The New Folkestone Society Newsletter, Summer 2009, 10-13
'Barselona'nın Müzik Sarayları', Antik Dekor, November–December 2009, issue: 115, 82-88
'Stancioff'un hatırladığı Maria Callas', Andante, December 2009, issue: 42, 58-61
'Malta'nın kayıp ve yaşayan operaları', Antik Dekor, February–March 2010, issue: 117, 116-119
'Tosti, Caruso, Delius ve The Grand, Folkestone', Andante, February 2010, issue: 44, 58-61
 'Pathétique Senfoni'yle karlı bir Şubat'ta St. Petersburg'dan Klin'e Çaykovski'nin izinde', Andante, March 2010, issue: 45, 62-66
 'Kansas'tan New York'a Türk Müziğinin Elçileri', Andante, May 2010, issue: 47, 66-69
 'Carnegie Hall'da Mehtaplı Bir Gece', Andante'', April 2012, issue: 68, 52-57

References

External links 

 The Musical Times A Levantine Life
 Emre Aracı Sultan Abdülaziz'i Warner Classics sanatçısı yaptı
 NTV: Klasik Batı müziğinde sultan portreleri
 CNN Turk: Emre Aracı'dan Türk Kasidesi
 Her Excellency the Wife of Omer Pasha article in English, published in Skylife Magazine
 Music to a Sultan's Ears

1968 births
Living people
Turkish musicians
Turkish musicologists
Turkish scientists
Alumni of the University of Edinburgh